Goran Čaušić (born 5 May 1992) is a Serbian professional footballer who plays as a midfielder in Thailand for Buriram United.

Club career

Early years
On 16 June 2009, Čaušić signed his first professional contract with Red Star Belgrade, on a three-year deal. He was subsequently sent on loan to Sopot, gaining experience for two seasons in the Serbian League Belgrade. In early 2012, Čaušić was transferred to Rad.

Eskişehirspor
On 26 December 2012, alongside Andrej Mrkela, Čaušić signed for Turkish club Eskişehirspor on a four-and-a-half-year deal. He scored his first goal for the club on 11 January 2013 in a Turkish Cup match against Mersin İdmanyurdu.

Osasuna
On 13 July 2016, Čaušić signed a two-year contract with Spanish La Liga club Osasuna. After featuring regularly but suffering relegation, he cut ties with the club on 5 July 2017.

Arsenal Tula
On 11 July 2017, Čaušić signed a two-year contract with the Russian Premier League club FC Arsenal Tula. At the time of his arrival, Arsenal Tula's coach was Miodrag Božović. On March 4, 2018, Čaušić scored a last minute goal from 22 meters out in a 1-0 win against Akhmat Grozny. He subsequently took off his shirt in celebration despite snowy conditions, and a fight ensued on the pitch between the two teams.

Return to Red Star Belgrade
On 31 August 2018, he returned to Red Star Belgrade. On September 15, 2018, in his first upon returning to Red Star, he scored a goal in a 6-0 home victory against Radnik Surdulica.

Return to Arsenal Tula
On 7 July 2019, he returned to FC Arsenal Tula, signing a long-term contract.

Buriram United
On 19 June 2022, Thailand club Buriram United announced the signing of Goran Čaušić.

International career
Čaušić represented his country at the 2011 UEFA European Under-19 Championship and the 2015 UEFA European Under-21 Championship.

Career statistics

Club

Honours
Red Star Belgrade
Serbian SuperLiga: 2018–19

Notes

References

External links
 
 
 
 

1992 births
Living people
Footballers from Belgrade
Serbian footballers
Serbia youth international footballers
Serbia under-21 international footballers
Association football midfielders
Red Star Belgrade footballers
FK Sopot players
FK Rad players
Eskişehirspor footballers
Manisaspor footballers
CA Osasuna players
FC Arsenal Tula players
Goran Causic
Serbian SuperLiga players
Süper Lig players
TFF First League players
La Liga players
Russian Premier League players
Goran Causic
Serbian expatriate footballers
Expatriate footballers in Turkey
Serbian expatriate sportspeople in Turkey
Expatriate footballers in Spain
Serbian expatriate sportspeople in Spain
Expatriate footballers in Russia
Serbian expatriate sportspeople in Russia
Expatriate footballers in Thailand
Serbian expatriate sportspeople in Thailand